Ceuthophilus latens, the black-sided camel cricket, is a species of camel cricket in the family Rhaphidophoridae. It is found in North America.

References

Further reading

 
 

latens
Insects described in 1863